Le Bourg-d’Hem is a commune in the Creuse department in the Nouvelle-Aquitaine region in central France.

Geography
The river Creuse flows through the commune, which is dammed near Guémontet, flooding much of the valley.

Population

Sights
 The chateau de Villebaston, dating from the twelfth century.
 The twelfth century church of St.Julien.
 The rebuilt watermill at Gué Vignaud.
 The dam, the ‘Barrage de l'Age’.

Personalities
 Marc Bloch, French historian, was shot on 16 June 1944, and is buried here.

See also
Communes of the Creuse department

References

Communes of Creuse